The Passenger Act of 1882 is a United States federal statute establishing occupancy control regulations for seafaring passenger ships completing Atlantic and Pacific transoceanic crossings to America during the late 19th century and early 20th century. The Act of Congress sanctioned vessel compartment dimensions in cubic feet comparable to the level within a ship's deck. The public law authorized the numerical serialization of berths which were subject to compartment occupancy inspections of emigrants and ocean liner passengers. The Law of the United States accentuated and endorsed a regulatory clause stating no person, on arrival of a vessel in a port, will be allowed to go aboard a passenger ship necessitating a bow to stern inspection.

The Immigration Act of 1882 was simultaneously presented during the 47th United States congressional session which was enacted into law on August 3, 1882. The H.R. 6722 bill was passed by the 47th congressional session and enacted into law by the 21st President of the United States Chester Arthur on August 2, 1882.

Provisions of the Act
The United States federal law was penned as fourteen sections with an emphasis concerning passenger quarters' allocations, hygiene requirements, furnished sick bay, public health awareness by imposed social distancing, and personal verification of emigrants and seafaring passengers occupancy during an oceanic voyage to an American port.  

Carriage of Passengers by Sea – 22 Stat. 186 § 1
Emigrants and passengers, other than cabin passengers, from foreign ports to be provided compartments 
Sailing vessel restrictions and requirements
Space per passenger
Computation of children boarded on vessel
Violation of Act penalties

Proper Accommodations on Steamships or Other Vessels  – 22 Stat. 186–187 § 2
Berths for passengers
Regulations and rules for occupancy
Children
Females
Husband and wife
Males
Unmarried females
Families
Serial numbers for berths
Inspections of berths
Violation of Act penalties

Sanitation and Ventilation of Steamships or Other Vessels – 22 Stat. 187–188 § 3
Light and air to passenger decks and compartments
Hatchways
Companionway
Caboose with sufficient cooking capacity
Water closet
Privy location to be separated from passengers' spaces with constructed partitions
Violation of Act penalties

Nutrition on Steamships or Other Vessels – 22 Stat. 188 § 4
Wholesome food as fresh provisions
Meals per day
Short allowance and monetary penalty paid by the deck master
Mothers with infants
Tables and seats
Violation of Act penalties

Hospital on Steamships or Other Vessels – 22 Stat. 188 § 5 
Hospital accommodations of two compartments
Qualified and competent surgeon or medical practitioner
Medicines and surgical appliances for diseases and accidents during sea voyages
Violation of Act penalties

Hygiene on Steamships or Other Vessels – 22 Stat. 188–189 § 6
Cleanliness and discipline to be maintained during voyage
Space on main deck for exercise of passengers
Violation of Act penalties

Navigational Crew on Steamships or Other Vessels – 22 Stat. 189 § 7
Officers and seamen prohibited from visiting passengers' compartments
Violation of section penalties
Section of Act posted on decks concerning fraternizing with navigational crew
Violation of Act penalties

Prohibited Articles on Steamships or Other Vessels – 22 Stat. 189 § 8
Dynamite
Gunpowder
Nitroglycerin
Vitriol
Other explosive compounds 
Violation of Act penalties

Boarding Arriving Vessels Before Inspection – 22 Stat. 189–190 § 9
No person, on arrival of vessel in port, allowed to go aboard 
Correct list of passengers, with deaths if any, to be delivered to first officer of customs on board 
Duplicate of list to be delivered to collector of customs
Violation of Act penalties

Death on the High Seas – 22 Stat. 190 § 10
In case of death of passengers at sea, master of vessel to pay, money paid into the U.S. Treasury
Violation of Act penalties

Occupancy Integrity of Steamships or Other Vessels – 22 Stat. 190 § 11
Examination and inspection of vessel by collector of customs
Report made to the Secretary of the U.S. Treasury

Applicability of Act for Vessels Carrying Emigrants and Passengers – 22 Stat. 191 § 12
Provisions of this act apply to vessels carrying emigrants from United States to foreign countries
Clearance of vessels withheld until compliance with provisions of this Act
Violation of Act penalties

Violations of Act Provisions for Steamships or Other Vessels – 22 Stat. 191 § 13
Fines and penalties to be lien upon vessel

Effective Date of Act Provisions – 22 Stat. 191 § 14
Act shall come into effect ninety days after passage of Act
Act may be cited for all purposes as "The Passenger Act, eighteen hundred and eighty-two"

Associated United States Federal Statutes
United States legislation relative to the Passenger Act of 1882.

See also
1847 North American typhus epidemic
Carriage of Passengers Act of 1855
Coffin ship
Diseases and epidemics of the 19th century
Quarantine
Steerage Act of 1819

Reading Bibliography

External links
 
 
 

1882 in American law
47th United States Congress
United States federal immigration and nationality legislation